Zambia, officially known as the Republic of Zambia, is a landlocked country in Southern Africa. The neighbouring countries are the Democratic Republic of the Congo to the north, Tanzania to the north-east, Malawi to the east, Mozambique, Zimbabwe, Botswana, and Namibia to the south, and Angola to the west. The capital city is Lusaka, located in the southeast of the country. The population is concentrated mainly around the capital and the Copperbelt to the northwest.

Topics related to Zambia (arranged alphabetically) include:

0-9
1977 Dan-Air Boeing 707 crash
2011 All-Africa Games

A
Aero Zambia
Africa
Africa House, The
Airwaves Airlink
Amayenge
Archdiocese of Lusaka

B
Ba Yombe
Balovale
BaLunda
Banani International Secondary School
Bangweulu Wetlands
Bank of Zambia
Baobab College
Barotseland
Bemba language
Bemba people
Benguela railway
British diaspora in Africa
British South Africa Company
British South Africa Police

C
Cairo Road
Canisius Secondary School
Cape to Cairo Road
Central Province, Zambia
Chambeshi River
Chavuma Falls
Chengelo Secondary School
Chewa people
Chichewa language
Chilanga Cement
Chimfunshi Wildlife Orphanage
Chipata Airport
Chirundu Bridge
Chitimukulu
Chizongwe Secondary School
Chokwe
Christianity in Zambia
Cilungu
Coat of arms of Zambia
Commonwealth XI cricket team in Rhodesia in 1962-63
Communications in Zambia
Congo Pedicle road
Congo Pedicle
Congo River
Copperbelt Province
Copperbelt strike (1935)
Copperbelt
Cuando River
Cuisine of Zambia

D
Dag Hammerskjold Stadium
Dambos
Demographics of Zambia
Disability in Zambia
Districts of Zambia
Distro Kuomboka
Dola Hill Stadium
Dugout (boat)

E
East African Campaign (World War I)
Eastern Air
Eastern Lunda
Eastern Province, Zambia
Economy of Zambia
Education in Zambia
Edwin Imboela Stadium
Elections in Zambia

F
Fanagalo
Federation of Free Trade Unions of Zambia
Federation of Rhodesia and Nyasaland election, 1953
Federation of Rhodesia and Nyasaland
First Quantum Minerals of Canada
Flag of Zambia
Football Association of Zambia
Foreign relations of Zambia
Forest Rangers Football Club
Forum for Democracy and Development

G
Garden Park
Geography of Zambia
Girl Guides Association of Zambia
Glencore International
Governor of Northern Rhodesia
Governor-General of the Federation of Rhodesia and Nyasaland
Great East Road (Zambia)
Great North Road (Zambia)
Green Buffaloes FC

H
Heritage Party
Hinduism in Zambia
History of Africa
History of Christianity in Zambia
History of Zambia

I
Ibwatu
Illovo Sugar
Independence Stadium (Zambia)
Ing-ombe Ilede
International XI cricket team in Rhodesia in 1961-62
Itezhi-Tezhi Dam

J
Judiciary of Zambia

K
Kabompo Ferry
Kabompo River
Kabwe Warriors Football Club
Kabwelume Falls
Kafue National Park
Kafue Railway Bridge
Kafue River
Kalambo Falls
Kalambo River
Kalindula
Kalungwishi River
Kanongesha-Lunda
Kaonde language
Kariba Dam
Kariba Gorge
Kasanka National Park
Katima Mulilo Bridge
Kavango–Zambezi Transfrontier Conservation Area
Kazembe
Kazungula Ferry
Kitwe United Football Club
Komboni
Konkola Blades Football Club
Konkola Copper Mines
Konkola Stadium
Kuomboka

L
Lake Bangweulu
Lake Ishiba Ng'andu
Lake Kariba
Lake Kashiba
Lake Mweru Wantipa
Lake Mweru
Lake Tanganyika
Lamba language
Languages of Zambia
LGBT rights in Zambia (Gay rights)
List of airports in Zambia
List of birds of Zambia
List of mammals in Zambia
List of national parks of Zambia
List of political parties in Zambia
List of presidents of Zambia
List of schools in Zambia
List of settlements in Zambia
List of vice presidents of Zambia
List of Zambian companies
List of Zambian parliamentary constituencies
List of Zambians
List of Zambia-related topics
Litunga
Liuwa Plain National Park
Livingstone Airport
Livingstone Memorial
Lochinvar National Park
Lower Zambezi National Park
Lozi language
Lozi people
Luambe National Park
Luanginga River
Luangwa Bridge
Luangwa River
Luapula Province border dispute
Luapula Province
Luapula River
Luena River, Western Zambia
Lukanga Swamp
Lukasashi River
Lukusuzi National Park
Lumangwe Falls
Lumpa Church
Lunda Empire
Lunda language
Lunda people
Lunga River (Zambia)
Lungwebungu River
Lunsemfwa River
Lusaka–Livingstone Road
Lusaka–Mongu Road
Lusaka Declaration
Lusaka Dynamos
Lusaka International Airport
Lusaka Province
Lusaka Stock Exchange
Lwiindi

M
M1 road (Zambia)
M3 road (Zambia)
M4 road (Zambia)
M8 road (Zambia)
M10 road (Zambia)
M11 road (Zambia)
M13 road (Zambia)
M14 Road (Zambia)
M16 road (Zambia)
M18 Road (Zambia)
Mambwe language
Mambwe
Mangwe
Mashombe Blue Jeans
Mbereshi River
Mfuwe Airport
Ministry of Energy (Zambia)
Ministry of Health (Zambia)
Mita Hills Dam
Mofwe Lagoon
Monuments and Historic Sites of Zambia
Mosi-oa-Tunya National Park
Mount Makulu Zambia
Movement for Multiparty Democracy
Mpika railway station
Mporokoso Group
Mufulira Wanderers
Mulobezi Railway
Mulungushi Dam
Mulungushi River
Mulungushi Rock of Authority
Mulungushi
Munali Secondary School
Music of Zambia
Musikili Primary School
MV Liemba
Mwanga (ethnic group)
Mweru Wantipa National Park

N
Namwanga
National Arts Council of Zambia
National Assembly Football Club
National Assembly of Zambia
National Citizens' Coalition
National Democratic Focus
National Women's Lobby Group
Nationwide Airlines (Zambia)
Nchanga Rangers
Nchanga Stadium
Ndola Airport
New Livingstone Stadium
New Lusaka Stadium
New Ndola Stadium
Ngoma Airport
Ngoma Music Award
Ngoni people
Ngonye Falls
Nkana Red Devils
Nkwazi Football Club
North Luangwa National Park
North-Eastern Rhodesia
Northern Province, Zambia
Northern Rhodesia at the 1964 Summer Olympics
Northern Rhodesia
Northern Rhodesian African National Congress
North-Western Province, Zambia
North-Western Rhodesia
Nsenga
Nshima
Nsolo
Nsumbu National Park
Ntumbachushi Falls
Nyamwanga
Nyiha
Nyika National Park, Zambia
Nyika Plateau

O
Old Drift cemetery

P
Paramount Chief Mpezeni
Patriotic Front (Zambia)
Politics of Zambia
Power Dynamos FC
Prime Minister of Zambia
Provinces of Zambia

R
Rail transport in Zambia
Railways Stadium
Revolutionary Socialist Party (Zambia)
Rhodesia (disambiguation)
Rhodesia and Nyasaland pound
Rhodesian Man
Rift Valley lakes
Roman Catholic Archdiocese of Kasama
Roman Catholic Diocese of Mansa
Roman Catholic Diocese of Mpika
Roman Catholicism in Zambia
Rungu (African ethnic group)

S
Sakeji School
Scouting in Zambia
Shona language
Silimba
Sioma Ngwezi National Park
Solwezi Airport
South Luangwa National Park
Southern Africa
Southern Province, Zambia
Stairs Expedition
Stand and Sing of Zambia, Proud and Free
Sunset Stadium

T
T2 road (Zambia)
T3 road (Zambia)
T5 road (Zambia)
T6 road (Zambia)
Tazama Pipeline
TAZARA Railway
Tokaleya
Tonga baskets
Tonga language (Zambia)
Tonga people of Zambia and Zimbabwe
Trans–Caprivi Highway
Transport in Zambia
Tumbuka language
Tumbuka

U
United Democratic Alliance (Zambia)
United Liberal Party
United National Independence Party
United Party for National Development
United Progressive Party (Zambia)
United States Ambassador to Zambia
University of Zambia

V
Victoria Falls Bridge
Victoria Falls
Von Lettow-Vorbeck Memorial

W
Water supply and sanitation in Zambia
Water Transport in Zambia
Western Province, Zambia
White Fathers
Wildlife of Zambia

Y
Yauma language

Z
Zambeef Products
Zambezi Escarpment
Zambezi
Zambia Airways
Zambia Alliance for Progress
Zambia at the 1968 Summer Olympics
Zambia at the 1972 Summer Olympics
Zambia at the 1980 Summer Olympics
Zambia at the 1984 Summer Olympics
Zambia at the 1988 Summer Olympics
Zambia at the 1992 Summer Olympics
Zambia at the 1996 Summer Olympics
Zambia at the 2000 Summer Olympics
Zambia at the 2004 Summer Olympics
Zambia at the 2006 Commonwealth Games
Zambia Congress of Trade Unions
Zambia Consolidated Copper Mines
Zambia Davis Cup team
Zambia Independence Act 1964
Zambia Information and Communications Technology Authority
Zambia Medical Mission
Zambia national basketball team
Zambia National Commercial Bank
Zambia national cricket team
Zambia national football team
Zambia national rugby union team
Zambia Post
Zambia Railways
Zambia Red Cross Society
Zambia Republic Party
Zambia Scouts Association
Zambia women's national rugby union team
Zambia
Zambian African National Congress
Zambian Airways
Zambian Challenge Cup
Zambian Coca-Cola Cup
Zambian Cup
Zambian Defence Force
Zambian diplomatic missions
Zambian general election, 2006
Zambian kwacha
Zambian parliamentary election, 1991
Zambian parliamentary election, 2006
Zambian pound
Zambian Premier League
Zambian presidential election, 1991
Zambian presidential election, 2001
Zambian presidential election, 2006
Zambian traditional ceremonies
Zamrock
Zamtel
Zanaco FC
ZESCO United Football Club
.zm

See also
 Lists of country-related topics - similar lists for other countries
 List of Zambia-related topics (arranged by subject)
 Lists of Zambia-related topics
 List of settlements in Zambia
 List of Zambians
 List of mammals in Zambia
 List of birds of Zambia

 
Zambia